Thirappane Divisional Secretariat is a  Divisional Secretariat  of Anuradhapura District, of North Central Province, Sri Lanka.

Hotels
 Ulagalla Resort- Ulagalla is a luxury boutique hotel set on 58 acres 2 km from Thirippane town along the A6 highway. It is owned and managed by UGA Escapes, a subsidiary of FinCo group.

Attractions

References
 Divisional Secretariats Portal

Divisional Secretariats of Anuradhapura District